Dysschema superior is a moth of the family Erebidae. It was described by Peter Jörgensen in 1934. It is found in Paraguay.

References

Dysschema
Moths described in 1934